Hidden Falls is a waterfall in the U.S. state of North Carolina, located in Hanging Rock State Park in Stokes County.

Geology
The waterway is Indian Creek, which flows through Hanging Rock State Park, which continues down to Window Falls.

Visiting the Falls
The falls are open to the public and are accessible beginning at a parking area on the side of Hall Road.  Visitors may take a moderate-difficulty 0.5-mile (.9 km) trail to the falls.  Visitors may continue past Hidden Falls' viewing area for .1 miles to view Window Falls.

Nearby Falls
Hanging Rock State Park hosts 4 other waterfalls:

Tory's Falls
Lower Cascades
Upper Cascades
Window Falls

External links
North Carolina Waterfalls - Window Falls and Hidden Falls
Photos of Upper Cascades and Hidden Falls

Protected areas of Stokes County, North Carolina
Waterfalls of North Carolina
Waterfalls of Stokes County, North Carolina